Sofiivka Raion was a raion (district) of Dnipropetrovsk Oblast, southeastern-central Ukraine. Its administrative centre was located at the urban-type settlement of Sofiivka. The raion was abolished on 18 July 2020 as part of the administrative reform of Ukraine, which reduced the number of raions of Dnipropetrovsk Oblast to seven. The area of Sofiivka Raion was merged into Kryvyi Rih Raion.

At the time of disestablishment, the raion consisted of three hromadas:
 Devladove rural hromada with the administration in the settlement of Devladove;
 Sofiivka settlement hromada with the administration in Sofiivka;
 Vakulove rural hromada with the administration in the selo of Vakulove.

Zaporizke was  the oldest  village in the Sofiivka Raion.

References

Former raions of Dnipropetrovsk Oblast
1923 establishments in Ukraine
Ukrainian raions abolished during the 2020 administrative reform